The Edmonton Rush are a lacrosse team based in Edmonton, Alberta playing in the National Lacrosse League (NLL). The 2006 season was the Rush's inaugural season.

After starting the season 0-6, the Rush finally won their first-ever game, beating their provincial rivals the Calgary Roughnecks in Calgary. That was the high point of the season for the Rush, who didn't win again until the 2007 season.

Regular season

Conference standings

Game log
Reference:

Player stats
Reference:

Runners (Top 10)

Note: GP = Games played; G = Goals; A = Assists; Pts = Points; LB = Loose Balls; PIM = Penalty minutes

Goaltenders
Note: GP = Games played; MIN = Minutes; W = Wins; L = Losses; GA = Goals against; Sv% = Save percentage; GAA = Goals against average

Awards

Transactions

Trades

*Later traded to the New York Titans
**Later traded to the Arizona Sting
***Later traded to the Boston Blazers
****Later traded to the Portland LumberJax
*****Later traded back to the Portland LumberJax
******Later traded to the Chicago Shamrox

Entry Draft
The 2005 NLL Entry Draft took place on August 29, 2005. The Rush made the following selections:

 Denotes player who never played in the NLL regular season or playoffs

Roster
Reference:

See also
2006 NLL season

References

Edmonton